The Department of Agriculture was a department in the Government of New Brunswick, Canada. It was responsible for management of the Province's Agriculture industries. The member of the Executive Council responsible for the department was initially called the Commissioner of Agriculture. The department would become known as the Department of Agriculture and Rural Development in the late 1990s.

From 1882, the Department of Agriculture was also responsible for fisheries until 1963 when the government of Premier Louis Robichaud created a separate Department of Fisheries. This department would be renamed the Department of Fisheries & Aquaculture which in 2000 was merged with the Department of Agriculture and Rural Development to become the Department of Agriculture, Fisheries and Aquaculture. This department lasted until October 3, 2006 when Premier Shawn Graham split the departments into the Department of Agriculture and Aquaculture and reestablished the separate Department of Fisheries.

Ministers

Defunct New Brunswick government departments and agencies
New Brunswick
Ministries established in 1882
1882 establishments in Canada
Agricultural organizations based in Canada